Sarah Donia Knee (born 29 March 1996) is a Hungarian-Canadian ice hockey player and member of the Hungarian national ice hockey team, currently playing in the Naisten Liiga (NSML) with KalPa Naiset. She represented Hungary at the 2021 IIHF Women's World Championship.

Playing career

Born in Toronto, Knee played minor ice hockey in the Greater Toronto Area throughout her childhood, eventually earning a spot with the Toronto Aeros of the Provincial Women's Hockey League (PWHL) during her senior year of high school. Her college ice hockey career was played during 2014 to 2018, with the Cornell Big Red women's ice hockey program in the Ivy League and ECAC Hockey conferences of the NCAA Division I. In 2018, she was named to the All-Ivy First Team and All-ECAC Hockey Third Team.

References

External links 
 

1996 births
Living people
Ice hockey people from Ontario
Canadian women's ice hockey defencemen
Hungarian women's ice hockey defencemen
Cornell Big Red women's ice hockey players
Canadian expatriate ice hockey players in Hungary
Canadian expatriate ice hockey players in the United States
KMH Budapest (women) players